Oh My My may refer to:

 Oh My My (album), by OneRepublic, 2016
 Oh My My, an album by JTR, 2015
 "Oh My My" (the Monkees song), 1970
 "Oh My My" (Ringo Starr song), 1973
 "Oh My My", a song by Ani DiFranco from Evolve
 "Oh My My", a song by Jane Siberry from Maria
 "Oh My My", a song by Jill Barber from Chances
"Oh My My", a song by New Zealand band Nomad
 "Oh My My", a song by South Park Mexican from Time Is Money
 "Oh My My", an episode of ChalkZone
 Oh My My (Blue October song)

See also 
 There's No Sky (Oh My My), a 2009 album by Jaill
 "Mary's Song (Oh My My My)", a song by Taylor Swift from Taylor Swift
 Oh My (disambiguation)
 My Oh My (disambiguation)